Michael D. Kennedy (born May 21, 1969) is an American baseball coach and former catcher, who is the current head coach of the Elon Phoenix. He played college baseball at Elon for coaches Rick Jones and Mike Harden from 1988 to 1990 and played in Minor League Baseball (MiLB) for 2 seasons from 1990 to 1991. Under Kennedy, the Phoenix have won four Southern Conference regular season championships, one Southern Conference baseball tournament championship, one Colonial Athletic Association and made five NCAA Regional appearances.

Head coaching record
The following is a table of Kennedy's yearly records as an NCAA head baseball coach.

}}

Notes

References

External links

1969 births
Living people
Baseball catchers
Elon Phoenix baseball players
Modesto A's players
Arizona League Athletics players
Southern Oregon A's players
Elon Phoenix baseball coaches
Sportspeople from Fayetteville, North Carolina
Baseball coaches from North Carolina